The Prime Ministerial Limousine is the official state car used by the Prime Minister of Australia. The current vehicle is a white BMW 7 Series. The prime ministerial and other ministerial limousines are maintained by COMCAR, a subdivision of the Department of Finance. The vehicle is often referred to in the media and the community as "C1", which is the number plate that the car displays (meaning "Commonwealth 1"). The Australian flag is centrally mounted on the bonnet of the vehicle.

Prime ministerial vehicles are transported and used wherever the prime minister travels. The vehicle is stored at Parliament House, the Lodge, Kirribilli House or an allocated COMCAR facility. While COMCAR administers the vehicles, they are driven by Australian Federal Police officers. Tony Abbott was the first prime minister to use the BMW 7 Series. The past model of prime ministerial limousine, the Holden Caprice, was first used by Bob Hawke, replacing the Ford LTDs that had been used in the 1980s.

Current vehicle
The prime ministerial fleet was updated in 2014, replacing the Holden Caprice fleet with a suite of armoured BMW 7 Series models. The $6.3 million (AUD) fleet of BMW 7 Series were purchased initially by the Australian Government to protect visiting dignitaries for the 2014 G20 summit in Brisbane, and were later commissioned as the official prime ministerial fleet. The limousine, manufactured in Germany, has undergone extensive mechanical and protection-based modifications including armour and bulletproofing. The prime ministerial state car and a supporting armoured BMW X5 is administered by COMCAR, a division of the Australian Government's Department of Finance, and driven by trained officers of the Australian Federal Police.

Protection specifications
The vehicle has the same visual appearance as a regular BMW 7 Series. However, it has been subject to extensive modifications. The limousine has been fitted with bullet-proofed doors and windows as well as armour on the floor of the vehicle. On top of this, the vehicle has a protected fuel tank that does not explode when damaged and can withstand a roadside bomb.  The off-the-shelf replacements for the older Holden Caprice vehicles offer greater protection and better value for money. A BAE and GM-Holden Consortium also unsuccessfully bid for the contract.

Previous prime ministerial limousines
Holden Caprice
Ford LTD (Australia)
Mercedes-Benz 450SEL
Bentley S3

Gallery

See also
 Official state car
 Air transports of heads of state and government
 Royal Australian Air Force VIP aircraft
 Ford Fairlane (Australia) - discontinued (announced May 2007)
 Australian VIP transport

References

External links

COMCAR website
Rocky road for PM's fleet of limos – The Australian, 6 August 2005
Julia Gillard's clunker limo has windows that won't wind down – News.com.au, 10 March 2013
Five Australian Prime Ministerial cars through history – carsales.com.au, 5 August 2020

Prime Minister of Australia
Road transport of heads of state
Cars of Australia